The 2004 Pioneer PureVision Las Vegas Bowl was a post–season American college football bowl game, held on December 23, 2004, at Sam Boyd Stadium on the campus of the University of Nevada, Las Vegas,  as a part of 2004–05 NCAA Bowl season. It was the 13th edition of the Las Vegas Bowl.  The game featured the Wyoming Cowboys from the Mountain West Conference and the UCLA Bruins from the Pac-10 Conference. The game marked the first meeting between the two programs.

Wyoming appeared in their first Las Vegas Bowl, and their first trip to a bowl game since appearing in the 1993 Copper Bowl. It was their 11th bowl appearance in program history. The win ended the Cowboys' six-game bowl losing streak. UCLA made its second trip to the Las Vegas bowl, their 26th trip to a bowl, and third consecutive bowl trip. The Bruins had defeated the New Mexico Lobos 27–13 in the 2002 Las Vegas Bowl.

Wyoming upset UCLA, 24–21, on a 12–yard touchdown pass from Corey Bramlet to John Wadkowski with 57 seconds left in the game. The game was televised by ESPN.

Game summary

UCLA wore their home blue uniforms, and Wyoming wore white visitor uniforms. MVP Corey Bramlet went 20–34 for 307 yards and 2 touchdowns. Maurice Jones-Drew rushed for 126 yards on 26 carries for the Bruins. The Cowboys out gained the Bruins in yardage, 405 to 311.

Statistics

Scoring summary

References

External links
 UCLA vs. Wyoming

Las Vegas Bowl
Las Vegas Bowl
Wyoming Cowboys football bowl games
UCLA Bruins football bowl games
Las
December 2004 sports events in the United States